Christian Wolfgang Lindner (born 7 January 1979) is a German politician of the Free Democratic Party (FDP) serving as the Federal Minister of Finance since 8 December 2021. He has been the party leader of the liberal FDP since 2013 and a Member of the Bundestag (MdB) for North Rhine-Westphalia since 2017, previously holding a seat from 2009 until 2012.

Early life and education
Christian Lindner was born in Wuppertal, Germany. His father Wolfgang Lindner is a teacher of mathematics and computer science at the Städtisches Gymnasium in Wermelskirchen.

After graduating from Gymnasium in 1998 and an alternative civilian service, Christian Lindner studied political science at the University of Bonn from 1999 to 2006. After eleven semesters he acquired the academic degree of Magister Artium (M.A). In his magister's thesis at the Institute of Political Science, he dealt with the topic: "Tax competition and revenue sharing. Can the financial constitution be reformed?" In 2006, he began writing his dissertation under supervision from political science professor Frank Decker, which he has so far not completed due to his political activities.

While studying Lindner became a reserve officer in the Air Force. In 2002, he was promoted to First lieutenant (Oberleutnant) in the Reserve. In 2008 he was a liaison officer to the state command Landeskommando of the state of North Rhine-Westphalia in Düsseldorf. Since September 2011 he has held the rank of Captain (Hauptmann) in the Reserve. Currently Lindner is a Major in the German Air Forces Reserve.

Early political career
Lindner joined the FDP in 1995. He has been a member of the executive board of the FDP in the state of North Rhine-Westphalia since 1998 and became Secretary General in 2004 (until February 2010). At the May 2000 election for the Landtag of North Rhine-Westphalia, the 21-year old Lindner was elected, becoming the youngest MP in the history of the state parliament of North Rhine-Westphalia. Lindner was from 2000 initially 'spokesman for Intergenerational Affairs, Family and Integration' and then from 2005 to 2009 was also vice chairman of the FDP parliamentary group in the parliament and spokesman for Innovation, Science and Technology. In 2007 he also became a member of the executive board of the FDP on federal level.

From 2009 Lindner was a member of the German Bundestag. In the negotiations to form a coalition government following the 2009 federal elections, he was part of the FDP delegation in the working group on families, integration of immigrants and culture, led by Maria Böhmer and Hans-Joachim Otto.

From December 2009 until his surprise resignation in December 2011, Lindner was also Secretary General of the FDP on federal level, largely under the leadership of party chairman Guido Westerwelle and later under Philipp Rösler when Westerwelle had to resign. Lindner's resignation was caused by an internal party vote which had been forced by a group centered around the Eurosceptic FDP parliamentarian Frank Schäffler to determine the FDP's future course on questions pertaining to the European Stability Mechanism (ESM).

Lindner was later chosen to chair the NRW FDP in the 2012 state election of North Rhine-Westphalia, succeeding Daniel Bahr. In the election, the FDP received 8.6% of the vote, surpassing all expectations at the time as the party had been fighting overall the country to reach the minimum representation of 5% for years and was losing representation in several states. Following the party's victory at that election he was elected Parliamentary leader of the FDP in the NRW Landtag, succeeding Gerhard Papke on 15 May 2012, and worked in the opposition. In March 2013, he was elected one of Rösler's deputies, alongside Sabine Leutheusser-Schnarrenberger and Holger Zastrow.

FDP Chairman
Lindner was elected the new chairman of the FDP following the resignation of Chairman Philipp Rösler after the 2013 German federal elections in which the FDP failed to clear the 5% hurdle to enter the Bundestag for the first time since 1949.

Ahead of the 2014 European elections, Lindner and Dutch Prime Minister Mark Rutte served as ‘mediators’ between Olli Rehn and Guy Verhofstadt, the Alliance of Liberals and Democrats for Europe’s candidates for the presidency of the European Commission; eventually, the candidates agreed to jointly lead the ALDE's campaign for elections, with Verhofstadt running to succeed José Manuel Barroso. At the time, Linder was widely regarded to support Rehn.

Lindner was a FDP delegate to the Federal Convention for the purpose of electing the President of Germany in 2017, where he endorsed the government's candidate Frank-Walter Steinmeier. That same year, he led his party's successful campaign for the 2017 state elections of North Rhine-Westphalia, which resulted in the FDP joining the state government of incoming Minister-President Armin Laschet. Lindner himself did not take a position in the new government because of his aim to lead the FDP back to the Bundestag in September 2017, which he achieved with a result of 10.7%. After that success he was elected leader of the FDP parliamentary group in the Bundestag.

In October 2017, Angela Merkel's CDU and Katrin Göring-Eckardt's and Cem Özdemir's Greens started negotiations with the FDP to form a government, in which Lindner was widely seen as the future Minister of Finance, as the CDU had even nominated the former Minister Wolfgang Schäuble as President of the Bundestag to make place for the FDP. Such a coalition was the only realistic possibility to form a government (except for a Grand coalition) but had almost never been used before on any regional level in Germany. In November 2017, after midnight, Lindner and his party left the already prolonged negotiations after four unsuccessful weeks, which led to the longest government formation in German history and finally in March 2018 once more to a Grand Coalition with the SPD, which had previously rejected any participation in the new government.

Federal Minister of Finance
Following the 2021 German federal election, the FDP agreed to enter government with the Greens and Social Democrats, as part of a traffic light coalition led by Olaf Scholz. Lindner was named as Finance Minister, and took office on 8 December 2021.

After the G7 countries announced that they would present strong sanctions against Russia, Lindner stated that they should target Russian oligarchs. He stated: “We are working on further sanctions.  I am particularly concerned that the oligarchs should be affected. Those who have profited from Putin and stolen the wealth of the Russian people, including through corruption, should not be allowed to enjoy their prosperity in our Western democracies“.

On the night of February 24, 2022, right after Russia started its invasion of Ukraine, Christian Lindner, according to the Ambassador of Ukraine in Germany, told Ukraine's ambassador Andriy Melnyk that "Ukraine has only a few hours" left, so he opposed arms supplies to Kyiv and Russia's disconnection from SWIFT. On 17 May 2022, Lindner said he is "politically open to the idea of seizing" the frozen foreign-exchange reserves of the Central Bank of Russia —which amount to over $300 billion— to cover the costs of rebuilding Ukraine after the war.

Other activities

International organizations
 European Bank for Reconstruction and Development (EBRD), ex-officio Member of the Board of Governors (since 2021)
 European Investment Bank (EIB), ex-officio Member of the Board of Governors (since 2021)
 European Stability Mechanism (ESM), ex-officio Member of the Board of Governors (since 2021)
 Asian Infrastructure Investment Bank (AIIB), ex-officio Member of the Board of Governors (since 2021)
 International Monetary Fund (IMF), ex-officio Alternate Member of the Board of Governors (since 2021)

Corporate boards
 KfW, Ex-Officio Member of the Board of Supervisory Directors (since 2021)
 RAG-Stiftung, Ex-Officio Member of the Board of Trustees (since 2021)

Non-profit organizations
 Borussia Dortmund, Member of the Business Advisory Board (since 2018)
Aktive Bürgerschaft, Member of the Board of Trustees
Friedrich Naumann Foundation, Member of the Board of Trustees
ZDF, Member of the Television Board
 Heinrich Heine University (HHU), Institut für Deutsches und Internationales Parteienrecht und Parteienforschung, Member of the Board of Trustees
 Deutsche AIDS-Stiftung, Member of the Board of Trustees
 Walther Rathenau Institute, Member of the Advisory Board
 Deutsche Nationalstiftung, Member of the Senate
 NRW Foundation, Member of the Board of Trustees
 Captain in the German Air Forces reserve
 Rotary International, Member

Political positions

Foreign policy
In 2022, Lindner called for renewed talks over a free trade agreement between the European Union and the United States, aiming to revive discussions on the so-called Transatlantic Trade and Investment Partnership (TTIP).

Entrepreneurship
In early 2015, an impassioned response to heckling by Lindner, defending entrepreneurs and startup culture made it onto newspaper front pages and became one of the most watched political speeches in months. Lindner was speaking before the state legislature in North Rhine-Westphalia about the importance of entrepreneurship and how failed entrepreneurs deserve a second chance when a Social Democratic member in the audience heckled: "That [failure] is something you have experience in." That was a reference to an Internet company co-founded by Lindner that failed after the dot-com bubble burst in the early 2000s. Lindner responded with a 2½-minute speech, saying: "If one succeeds, one ends up in the sights of the Social Democratic redistribution machinery and, if one fails, one can be sure of derision and mockery." He added that this particular member preferred to have a secure job in public service for his entire life, rather than daring to found a company, and how the message of that heckling attempt was the total opposite of what had been announced just minutes earlier by the president of the state legislature, who also happened to be an SPD member.

Bild, the highest-circulation daily newspaper in Germany, praised Lindner on its front page. The Berlin daily Tagesspiegel said the rant offered a welcome contrast to the "persistent fog of alternative-less Merkelism" that characterized debate in the Bundestag. What they were referring to was the situation that because of the narrow defeats of the FDP and the AfD, the opposition in the Bundestag only included left parties. Many policies of Merkel's government directly came from their centre-left coalition partner SPD or were at least negotiated and harmonised with them, and then only left parties reacted on them, who usually criticized that those policies were not enough and advocated for more investment into them or stronger policies but did not oppose them on a principal basis.

Financial policy
Shortly after the 2017 elections, Lindner ruled out taking on new debt to manage the balancing act of cutting income taxes and increasing investment on digital infrastructure. He criticized outgoing Finance Minister Wolfgang Schäuble for not being tough enough on Greece and not cutting income taxes for middle-class workers.

Personal life
In 2011, Lindner married journalist Dagmar Rosenfeld; they had started dating in 2009. On 19 April 2018, they announced their separation. In 2018, he started dating journalist Franca Lehfeldt, whom he married in 2022.

References

External links

German Bundestag - Abgeordneter Christian Lindner (German)
Lindner's personal website (mostly in German)
English section on his personal website
Lindner's profile on the party website

|-

1979 births
Living people
Finance ministers of Germany
Members of the Landtag of North Rhine-Westphalia
Members of the Bundestag for North Rhine-Westphalia
University of Bonn alumni
Members of the Bundestag 2021–2025
Members of the Bundestag 2017–2021
Members of the Bundestag 2009–2013
Members of the Bundestag for the Free Democratic Party (Germany)
Landtag group leaders (North Rhine-Westphalia)